Rachel Christoffelsz (29 September 1885 – 1975) was a Sri Lankan doctor. She was one of the first women from the country to qualify as a doctor.

Biography 
Christoffelsz completed her medical studies in 1909. She worked as a medical officer in Colombo Municipal Medical Service and practiced pediatrics and antenatal care in Colombo until 1925.

Christoffelsz  retired from medical practice in 1927.

Personal life 
In 1925, Christoffelsz married Arthur Percival Rowlands, owner of Rowlands Garages.

References 

1885 births
1975 deaths
Sri Lankan medical doctors
People from British Ceylon